The term University of Córdoba or Cordoba could refer to the following:

 Cordoba University (United States)
 National University of Córdoba (Argentina)
 University of Cordoba (Colombia)
 University of Córdoba (Spain)
 Workers' University of Córdoba (Spain)
 Cordoba Private University (Syria)